Józef Polonek (4 February 1949 – 14 September 2021) was a Polish professional footballer who played as a forward for Wisła Kraków in the 1970–71 Ekstraklasa.

Career 
Polonek started his career with Wawel Kraków. In the spring round of the 1970–71 Ekstraklasa season, he played four matches in the Ekstraklasa (then known as the I liga) for Wisła Kraków. Between 1971 and 1975 he was a player in Garbarnia Kraków, and he ended his football career at KS Borek.

Death 
Polonek died on 14 September 2021. He was buried on 17 September 2021 at the Batowice Cemetery in Kraków.

References 

1949 births
2021 deaths
Polish footballers
Association football forwards
Wisła Kraków players
Garbarnia Kraków players
Ekstraklasa players